The 2001 IAAF World Cross Country Championships took place on March 24/25, 2001.  The races were held at the Hippodrome Wellington in Ostend (Oostende), Belgium.  Reports of the event were given in The New York Times, in the Herald,  and for the IAAF.

Complete results for senior men, for senior men's teams, for men's short race, for men's short race teams, for junior men, for junior men's teams, senior women, for senior women's teams, for women's short race, for women's short race teams, for junior women,  for junior women's teams, medallists, and the results of British athletes who took part were published.

Medallists

Race results

Senior men's race (12.3 km)

Note: Athletes in parentheses did not score for the team result

Men's short race (4.1 km)

Note: Athletes in parentheses did not score for the team result

Junior men's race (7.7 km)

Note: Athletes in parentheses did not score for the team result

Senior women's race (7.7 km)

Note: Athletes in parentheses did not score for the team result

Women's short race (4.1 km)

Note: Athletes in parentheses did not score for the team result

Junior women's race (5.9 km)

Note: Athletes in parentheses did not score for the team result

Medal table (unofficial)

Note: Totals include both individual and team medals, with medals in the team competition counting as one medal.

Participation
An unofficial count yields the participation of 790 athletes from 67 countries. This is in agreement with the official numbers as published.

 (18)
 (2)
 (10)
 (17)
 (1)
 (24)
 (35)
 (1)
 (5)
 (20)
 (8)
 (2)
 (33)
 (10)
 (1)
 (2)
 (5)
 (12)
 (12)
 (4)
 (30)
 (26)
 (1)
 (8)
 (1)
 (24)
 (22)
 (30)
 (24)
 (36)
 (2)
 (8)
 (2)
 (4)
 (12)
 (17)
 (7)
 (6)
 (2)
 (2)
 (1)
 (27)
 (4)
 (7)
 (12)
 (3)
 (1)
 (2)
 (14)
 (35)
 (5)
 (2)
 (1)
 (12)
 (19)
 (7)
 (9)
 (20)
 (5)
 (3)
 (35)
 (36)
 (24)
 (4)
 (4)
 (8)
 (4)

See also
 2001 IAAF World Cross Country Championships – Senior men's race
 2001 IAAF World Cross Country Championships – Men's short race
 2001 IAAF World Cross Country Championships – Junior men's race
 2001 IAAF World Cross Country Championships – Senior women's race
 2001 IAAF World Cross Country Championships – Women's short race
 2001 IAAF World Cross Country Championships – Junior women's race
 2001 in athletics (track and field)

References

External links
Official site

 
2001
Cross Country Championships
C
Cross Country
Sport in Ostend
Cross country running in Belgium
IAAF World Cross Country Championships